PMAA may refer to:

 Petroleum Marketers Association of America
 Poly(methacrylic acid), a polymer of methacrylic acid
 Presidential Management Alumni Association, a non-profit related to the US Presidential Management Fellows Program